Josh Harkins (born 5 April 1974) is an American politician. He serves as a Republican member of the Mississippi State Senate.

Early life
Josh Harkins was born on April 5, 1974 in Jackson, Mississippi. He graduated from Mississippi State University.

Career
Harkins has served as a Republican member of the Mississippi State Senate since 2012, where he represents District 20, including parts of Rankin County, Mississippi.

Personal life
Harkins is married to Andrea Scales and has two children. They reside in Flowood, Mississippi.

Trivia
Harkins was featured on the Mississippi episode of Irish network TG4's television travel series Hector - Ó Chósta go Cósta, speaking in support of the benefits of exercise and fitness for Mississippians at the Paul Lacoste gym.

References

Living people
1974 births
Politicians from Jackson, Mississippi
People from Flowood, Mississippi
Republican Party Mississippi state senators
21st-century American politicians